The Anderson Lodge or Anderson Studio was built in 1890 in the Absaroka Mountains west of Meeteetse, Wyoming, in what was then the Yellowstone Park Timber Land Reserve, soon renamed the Yellowstone Forest Reserve. The two-story rustic log structure became the home of rancher and artist Abraham Archibald Anderson from 1901 to 1905. Anderson played a significant role in the development of the forest reserve as Special Superintendent of Forest Reserves, and the Anderson Lodge was used as an administrative building for the forest.

The National Register lists the site as a historic district, including the Anderson Lodge, a one-room log cabin, an outhouse, two log footbridges, a developed spring, and a pole corral. Its significance is related to its wilderness setting, its association with the beginning of a national conservation movement in the United States, and the early history of the United States Forest Service.

The lodge location is now managed as part of Shoshone National Forest, in the Washakie Wilderness.

References

External links
Anderson Lodge at the Wyoming State Historic Preservation Office

Historic districts on the National Register of Historic Places in Wyoming
Houses on the National Register of Historic Places in Wyoming
1890s architecture in the United States
Rustic architecture in Wyoming
Houses in Park County, Wyoming
National Register of Historic Places in Park County, Wyoming
Houses completed in 1890